The Academy (Ancient Greek: Ἀκαδημία) was founded by Plato in c. 387 BC in Athens. Aristotle studied there for twenty years (367–347 BC) before founding his own school, the Lyceum. The Academy persisted throughout the Hellenistic period as a skeptical school, until coming to an end after the death of Philo of Larissa in 83 BC. The Platonic Academy was destroyed by the Roman dictator Sulla in 86 BC.

History
The Akademia was a school outside the city walls of ancient Athens. It was located in or beside a grove of olive trees  dedicated to the goddess Athena, which was on the site even before Cimon enclosed the precincts with a wall, and was called Academia after its original owner, an Attic hero in Greek mythology. Academus was said to have saved Athens from attack by Sparta, revealing where Helen of Troy was hidden, when she had been kidnapped by King Theseus years before the incidents of the later Trojan War. Having thus spared Athens a war (or at least delayed it), Academus was seen as a savior of Athens. His land, six stadia (a total of about one kilometer, or a half mile, the exact length of a stadion varied) north of Athens, became revered even by neighboring city-states, escaping destruction during the many local wars.

The site of the Academy was sacred to Athena; it had sheltered her religious cult since the Bronze Age. The site was perhaps also associated with the twin hero-gods Castor and Polydeuces (the Dioscuri), since the hero Akademos associated with the site was credited with revealing to the brothers where the abductor Theseus had hidden their sister Helen. Out of respect for its long tradition and its association with the Dioscuri – who were patron gods of Sparta – the Spartan army would not ravage these original "groves of Academe" when they invaded Attica. Their piety was not shared by the Roman Sulla, who had the sacred olive trees of Athena cut down in 86 BC to build siege engines.

Among the religious observances that took place at the Akademeia was a torchlit night race from altars within the city to Prometheus' altar in the Akademeia. The road to Akademeia was lined with the gravestones of Athenians, and funeral games also took place in the area as well as a Dionysiac procession from Athens to the Hekademeia and then back to the city.

Plato's school

What was later to be known as Plato's school appears to have been part of Academia. Plato inherited the property at the age of thirty, with informal gatherings which included Theaetetus of Sunium, Archytas of Tarentum, Leodamas of Thasos, and Neoclides. According to Debra Nails, Speusippus "joined the group in about 390 BC". She claims, "It is not until Eudoxus of Cnidos arrives in the mid-380s BC that Eudemus recognizes a formal Academy." There is no historical record of the exact time the school was officially founded, but modern scholars generally agree that the time was the mid-380s, probably sometime after 387 BC, when Plato is thought to have returned from his first visit to Sicily. Originally, the meetings were held on Plato's property as often as they were at the nearby Academy gymnasium; this remained so throughout the fourth century.

Though the academy was open to the public, the main participants were upper-class men. It did not, at least during Plato's time, charge fees for membership. Therefore, there was probably not at that time a "school" in the sense of a clear distinction between teachers and students, or even a formal curriculum. There was, however, a distinction between senior and junior members. Two women are known to have studied with Plato at the Academy, Axiothea of Phlius and Lasthenia of Mantinea.

Diogenes Laërtius divided the history of the Academy into three: the Old, the Middle, and the New. At the head of the Old he put Plato, at the head of the Middle Academy, Arcesilaus, and of the New, Lacydes. Sextus Empiricus enumerated five divisions of the followers of Plato. He made Plato founder of the first Academy; Arcesilaus of the second; Carneades of the third; Philo and Charmadas of the fourth; and Antiochus of the fifth. Cicero recognised only two Academies, the Old and New, and had the latter commence with Arcesilaus.

Old Academy

Plato's immediate successors as "Scholarch" of the Academy were Speusippus (347–339 BC), Xenocrates (339–314 BC), Polemon (314–269 BC), and Crates (c. 269–266 BC). Other notable members of the Academy include Aristotle, Heraclides, Eudoxus, Philip of Opus, and Crantor.

In at least Plato's time, the school did not have any particular doctrine to teach; rather, Plato (and probably other associates of his) posed problems to be studied and solved by the others. There is evidence of lectures given, most notably Plato's lecture "On the Good"; but probably the use of dialectic was more common. According to an unverifiable story, dated of some 700 years after the founding of the school, above the entrance to the Academy was inscribed the phrase "May no ignorant of Geometry enter here."

Many have imagined that the Academic curriculum would have closely resembled the one canvassed in Plato's Republic.  Others, however, have argued that such a picture ignores the obvious peculiar arrangements of the ideal society envisioned in that dialogue.  The subjects of study almost certainly included mathematics as well as the philosophical topics with which the Platonic dialogues deal, but there is little reliable evidence.  There is some evidence for what today would be considered strictly scientific research:  Simplicius reports that Plato had instructed the other members to discover the simplest explanation of the observable, irregular motion of heavenly bodies: "by hypothesizing what uniform and ordered motions is it possible to save the appearances relating to planetary motions."  (According to Simplicius, Plato's colleague Eudoxus was the first to have worked on this problem.)

Plato's Academy is often said to have been a school for would-be politicians in the ancient world, and to have had many illustrious alumni.  In a recent survey of the evidence, Malcolm Schofield, however, has argued that it is difficult to know to what extent the Academy was interested in practical (i.e., non-theoretical) politics since much of our evidence "reflects ancient polemic for or against Plato".

Middle Academy
Around 266 BC Arcesilaus became Scholarch. Under Arcesilaus (c. 266–241 BC), the Academy strongly emphasized a version of Academic skepticism closely similar to Pyrrhonism. Arcesilaus was followed by Lacydes of Cyrene (241–215 BC), Evander and Telecles (jointly) (205 – c. 165 BC), and Hegesinus (c. 160 BC).

New Academy
The New or Third Academy begins with Carneades, in 155 BC, the fourth Scholarch in succession from Arcesilaus. It was still largely skeptical, denying the possibility of knowing an absolute truth. Carneades was followed by Clitomachus (129 – c. 110 BC) and Philo of Larissa ("the last undisputed head of the Academy," c. 110–84 BC).  According to Jonathan Barnes, "It seems likely that Philo was the last Platonist geographically connected to the Academy."

Around 90 BC, Philo's student Antiochus of Ascalon began teaching his own rival version of Platonism rejecting Skepticism and advocating Stoicism, which began a new phase known as Middle Platonism.

Destruction of the Academy

When the First Mithridatic War began in 88 BC, Philo of Larissa left Athens and took refuge in Rome, where he seems to have remained until his death. In 86 BC, Lucius Cornelius Sulla laid siege to Athens and conquered the city, causing much destruction. It was during the siege that he laid waste to the Academy, as Plutarch relates: "He laid hands upon the sacred groves and ravaged the Academy, which was the most wooded of the city's suburbs, as well as the Lyceum."

The destruction of the Academy seems to have been so severe as to make the reconstruction and re-opening of the Academy impossible. When Antiochus returned to Athens from Alexandria, c. 84 BC, he resumed his teaching but not in the Academy. Cicero, who studied under him in 79/8 BC, refers to Antiochus teaching in a gymnasium called Ptolemy. Cicero describes a visit to the site of the Academy one afternoon, which was "quiet and deserted at that hour of the day".

Neoplatonic Academy

Despite the Platonic Academy being destroyed in the first century BC, the philosophers continued to teach Platonism in Athens during the Roman era, but it was not until the early 5th century (c. 410) that a revived academy (which had no connection with the original Academy) was established by some leading neoplatonists. The origins of neoplatonist teaching in Athens are uncertain, but when Proclus arrived in Athens in the early 430s, he found Plutarch of Athens and his colleague Syrianus teaching in an Academy there. The neoplatonists in Athens called themselves "successors" (diadochoi, but of Plato) and presented themselves as an uninterrupted tradition reaching back to Plato, but there cannot have actually been any geographical, institutional, economic or personal continuity with the original academy. The school seems to have been a private foundation, conducted in a large house which Proclus eventually inherited from Plutarch and Syrianus. The heads of the Neoplatonic Academy were Plutarch of Athens, Syrianus, Proclus, Marinus, Isidore, and finally Damascius. The Neoplatonic Academy reached its apex under Proclus (died 485). Severianus studied under him.

The last Greek philosophers of the revived Neoplatonic Academy in the 6th century were drawn from various parts of the Hellenistic cultural world and suggest the broad syncretism of the common culture (see koine): Five of the seven Academy philosophers mentioned by Agathias were Syriac in their cultural origin: Hermias and Diogenes (both from Phoenicia), Isidorus of Gaza, Damascius of Syria, Iamblichus of Coele-Syria and perhaps even Simplicius of Cilicia.

In 529 the emperor Justinian ended the funding of the revived Neoplatonic Academy. However, other philosophical schools continued in Constantinople, Antioch, and Alexandria, which were the centres of Justinian's empire.

The last scholarch of the Neoplatonic Academy was Damascius (d. 540). According to Agathias, its remaining members looked for protection under the rule of Sassanid king Khosrau I in his capital at Ctesiphon, carrying with them precious scrolls of literature and philosophy, and to a lesser degree of science. After a peace treaty between the Persian and the Byzantine Empire in 532, their personal security (an early document in the history of freedom of religion) was guaranteed.

It has been speculated that the Neoplatonic Academy did not altogether disappear. After his exile, Simplicius (and perhaps some others) may have travelled to Carrhae near Edessa. From there, the students of an Academy-in-exile could have survived into the 9th century, long enough to facilitate an Arabic revival of the neoplatonist commentary tradition in Baghdad, beginning with the foundation of the House of Wisdom in 832. One of the major centers of learning in the intervening period (6th to 8th centuries) was the 
Academy of Gundishapur in Sassanid Persia.

Modern times
The site was rediscovered in the 20th century, in the modern Akadimia Platonos neighbourhood; considerable excavation has been accomplished and visiting the site is free.

Visitors today can visit the archaeological site of the Academy located on either side of the Cratylus street in the area of Colonos and Plato's Academy (Postal Code GR 10442). On either side of the Cratylus street are important monuments, including the Sacred House Geometric Era, the Gymnasium (1st century BC – 1st century AD), the Proto-Helladic Vaulted House and the Peristyle Building (4th century BC), which is perhaps the only major building that belonged to the actual Academy of Plato.

See also

Academy of Athens (modern)
Agora
Cyrenaics
Epicureanism
Hellenistic philosophy
Lyceum (classical)
Peripatetic school
Plato's Academy mosaic
Platonic Academy (Florence)
Platonism
Stoicism

Notes

References
 Baltes, M. 1993. "Plato's School, the Academy." Hermathena, (155): 5–26.
 Brunt, P. A. 1993. "Plato's Academy and Politics." In Studies in Greek History and Thought. Oxford: Clarendon Press, Chapter 10, 282–342. 
 Cherniss, H. 1945. The Riddle of the Early Academy. Berkeley and Los Angeles: University of California Press.
 Dancy, R. M. 1991. Two Studies in the Early Academy. Albany, NY: State University of New York Press.
 Dillon, J. M. 1979. "The Academy in the Middle Platonic Period." Dionysius, 3: 63–77.  
 Dillon, J. 2003. The Heirs of Plato. A Study of the Old Academy, 347–274 BC. Oxford: Clarendon Press.
Dillon, John. 2009. “How Does the Soul Direct the Body, After All? Traces of a Dispute on Mind-Body Relations in the Old Academy.” In Body and Soul in Ancient Philosophy, edited by D. Frede and B. Reis, 349–356. Berlin: De Gruyter.
 Dorandi, T. 1999. "Chronology: The Academy." In The Cambridge History of Hellenistic Philosophy. Edited by Keimpe Algra, Jonathan Barnes, Jaap Mansfeld, and Malcolm Schofield, 31–35. Cambridge, UK: Cambridge Univ. Press.
 Glucker, J.  1978. Antiochus and the Late Academy. Göttingen: Vandenhoeck & Ruprecht.
 Lynch, J. P. 1972. Aristotle's School: A Study of a Greek Educational Institution. Berkeley: University of California Press.
 Murray, J. S. 2006. "Searching for Plato's Academy, 1929–1940." Mouseion: Journal of the Classical Association of Canada, 6 (2): 219–256
 Russell, J. H. 2012. "When Philosophers Rule: The Platonic Academy and Statesmanship." History of Political Thought, 33 (2): 209–230.
 Wallach, J. R. 2002. "The Platonic Academy and Democracy." Polis (Exeter), 19 (1-2): 7–27
 Watts, E.  2007.  "Creating the Academy: Historical Discourse and the Shape of Community in the Old Academy". The Journal of Hellenic Studies, 127: 106–122.
 Wycherley, R. 1961. "Peripatos: The Athenian Philosophical SceneI". Greece & Rome, 8(2), 152–163.
 Wycherley, R. 1962. "Peripatos: The Athenian Philosophical SceneII". Greece & Rome, 9(1), 2–21.
 Zhmud, Leonid. 2006. "Science in the Platonic Academy". In The Origin of the History of Science in Classical Antiquity. pp. 82–116. Berlin: De Gruyter.

External links

 
 The Academy, entry in the Internet Encyclopedia of Philosophy
 Directions to the archaeological site of Plato's Academy, other useful information, and some photos

380s BC establishments
Ancient Athens
Archaeological sites in Attica
Educational institutions established in the 4th century BC
Education in classical antiquity
Hellenistic civilization
Landmarks in Athens
Academy
Ancient Greek archaeological sites in Greece
Gymnasiums (ancient Greece)